The Best Male Track Athlete ESPY Award was presented annually between 1993 and 2006 to the male track and field athlete, irrespective of nationality, adjudged to be the best in a given calendar year. Beginning in 2007, this award was combined with the parallel Best Female Track Athlete ESPY Award into the single Best Track and Field Athlete ESPY Award.

Between 1993 and 2004, the award voting panel comprised variously fans; sportswriters and broadcasters, sports executives, and retired sportspersons, termed collectively experts; and ESPN personalities, but balloting thereafter was exclusively by fans over the Internet from amongst choices selected by the ESPN Select Nominating Committee.

Through the 2001 iteration of the ESPY Awards, ceremonies were conducted in February of each year to honor achievements over the previous calendar year; awards presented thereafter were conferred in June and reflected performance from the June previous.

List of winners

See also
Best Female Track Athlete ESPY Award
European Athlete of the Year Award
IAAF Athlete of the Year Award
IAAF Golden League

Notes

References

External links
2008 ESPY results

ESPY Awards
Sport of athletics awards
Awards established in 1993
Awards disestablished in 2006